Héctor Carmona (29 July 1925 – 29 April 1987) was a Chilean modern pentathlete. He competed at the 1956 Summer Olympics.

References

1925 births
1987 deaths
Chilean male modern pentathletes
Olympic modern pentathletes of Chile
Modern pentathletes at the 1956 Summer Olympics
Sportspeople from Santiago
20th-century Chilean people